Lois Mae Toulson (born 26 September 1999) is a British diver. A specialist in the 10 metre platform, she won the gold medal at the inaugural European Games in 2015, and the senior European title in 2017. She competed in the women's synchronized ten metre platform event at the 2016 Summer Olympics with Tonia Couch. She won silver in mixed 10m platform synchro at the 2017 World Aquatics Championships with Matty Lee, and gold in the women's synchronized 10 metre platform at the 2018 European Aquatics Championships with Eden Cheng.

Early life
Toulson was raised in Huddersfield. She attended Whitcliffe Mount School and Elliott Hudson College.

Career
Having made her first senior international appearance at the 2015 European Championships. She also competed in the first European Games where she claimed gold; she closed her first senior season with individual gold and silver medals at FINA Grand Prix events in Singapore and Malaysia.

2017
At the 2017 European Diving Championships in Kyiv, Toulson won two golds, first in 10m platform, and in the mixed 10m platform synchro with diving partner Matty Lee.

At the 2017 World Aquatics Championships, Toulson and Lee won silver in the 10m mixed synchro.

2018
At the 2018 British Diving Championships, Toulson won the women's 10m platform event, scoring 336.90 points.

At the 2018 European Championships in Glasgow/Edinburgh, Toulson partnered with Eden Cheng in the women's 10 metre synchro platform and won a gold medal. Toulson also partnered with Matty Lee to win silver in the mixed synchronised 10m platform.

2021
At the 2021 FINA Diving World Cup held in Japan as an official test event for the 2020 Tokyo Olympics, Toulson and Cheng won silver in synchronised 10m platform, thereby securing their qualification to the Olympics.  They also won silver in Synchronised 10m platform two weeks later at the European Championships. At the 2020 Olympics, the pair finished seventh in the synchronized 10 metre platform after a poor start.

2022
She competed at the 2022 Commonwealth Games where she won silver medals in the women's 10 metre platform event and the mixed synchronised 10 metre platform event alongside Kyle Kothari.

Personal life
Toulson has been in a relationship with fellow Team GB diver Jack Laugher since 2017.

References

External links
 
 
 
 
 
 
 
 

1999 births
Living people
British female divers
Olympic divers of Great Britain
Divers at the 2016 Summer Olympics
Divers at the 2020 Summer Olympics
European Games medalists in diving
European Games gold medalists for Great Britain
Divers at the 2015 European Games
Commonwealth Games medallists in diving
Commonwealth Games silver medallists for England
Commonwealth Games bronze medallists for England
Divers at the 2018 Commonwealth Games
Divers at the 2022 Commonwealth Games
World Aquatics Championships medalists in diving
Sportspeople from Huddersfield
20th-century British women
21st-century British women
Medallists at the 2018 Commonwealth Games
Medallists at the 2022 Commonwealth Games